Salisbury Township was a civil township of Sangamon County, Illinois from 1861 to 1989.  The population was 591 at the 1980 census.

The voters of Sangamon County approved the township form of government in the November 6, 1860 election.  On March 1, 1861, the county board approved the ordinance creating the original 22 townships, one of which was Sackett Township.

The name was changed from Sackett Township to Salisbury Township 

In 1989, Salisbury Township was extinguished and its territory annexed to Fancy Creek and Gardner townships.

Demographics

References

External links 
US Census
Illinois State Archives

1861 establishments in Illinois
1989 disestablishments in Illinois
Populated places disestablished in 1989
Former townships in Illinois
Former populated places in Illinois
Springfield metropolitan area, Illinois
Townships in Sangamon County, Illinois